27 Miles Underwater is the second studio album by British hardcore punk band Higher Power. The album was released on 24 January 2020 through Roadrunner Records.

Composition
The album has been described as alternative rock, hardcore punk and alternative metal. Pitchfork called it "the most 1995 rock album of 2020", and as treating "’90s alt-rock with the reverence usually afforded to classic rock". On the album, vocalist Jimmy Wizard makes use of both screaming and "airy melodies", emphasising his dark lyrical style. Brooklyn Vegan called it "the first great rock album of 2020". In an article for Discovered Magazine, writer Matty Williamson praised the album for expanding the band's sound to include pop music sensibilities, while still retaining their prior hardcore punk sound.

Promotion 
The band embarked on their first tour as a headlining act in promotion of the album. The first leg of the tour was in the United States from 20 January 2020 through 10 February 2020. The band opened for Beartooth for their Disease Tour from 16 February to 6 March 2020 by playing shows in the United Kingdom and Europe.

The band was to resume touring with the Knotfest at Sea cruise ship music festival which was to be held from 10–14 August 2020 on a cruise from Barcelona, Spain to Naples, Italy. In May 2020 the event was postponed to August 2021 due to the ongoing COVID-19 pandemic, before being indefinitely postponed in July 2020.

On 1 September 2020, it was announced that Higher Power would play at Outbreak Fest 2021 which will be held from 25–27 June 2021 at the Bowlers Exhibition Centre in Manchester, United Kingdom.

Shows

Critical reception 

27 Miles Underwater was well received by contemporary music critics. On review aggregator website, Album of the Year, the album has an average rating of 77 out of 100 based on three critic reviews. Ian Cohen, writing for Pitchfork gave the album a 7.0 out of 10, calling it "the most 1995 sounding album of 2020". Cohen further said "while nearly every single part of a Higher Power song has an identifiable source, they cycle through ideas quick enough to avoid any charges of grand larceny even when they get caught stealing." He compared the album as a more accessible version of Turnstile, Creeper, or Code Orange. In a mixed review, Sam Houldon, writing for Punknews.org, also compared the album to Turnstile's sophomore album, Time & Space (also released through Roadrunner Records), and said that "straight off the bat; there is a lot of Turnstile in this record. Not to an extent that is fundamentally a problem, but certainly to an extent that you’re likely to find yourself thinking about it on more than one occasion."

Martyn Young, writing for Upset magazine gave the album an 8 out of 10 praising the composition and confidence on the record. Young wrote "it’s the sound of a confident band who know that they’re making a significant step up and are ready to shout about it."

Accolades

Track listing

Personnel
Higher Power
Jimmy "J-Town" Wizard – lead vocals
Louis Hardy – guitar
Max Harper – guitar
Ethan Wilkinson – bass
Alex Wizard – drums

Additional personnel
Gil Norton – production

See also
List of 2020 albums

References

External links 
 27 Miles Underwater at Roadrunner Records

2020 albums
Higher Power (band) albums
Roadrunner Records albums
Albums produced by Gil Norton